San Fernando Airport  is located  southwest of the center of San Fernando, a northwest suburb of Buenos Aires in Argentina. The airport is operated by Aeropuertos Argentina 2000.

Approaches to the airport are over dense urban population.

The San Fernando VOR-DME (Ident: FDO) is located on the field.

Statistics

See also

Transport in Argentina
List of airports in Argentina

References

External links
OpenStreetMap - San Fernando Airport
SkyVector - San Fernando Airport

Airports in Argentina